Hip Hop goes Theatre is an international hip-hop theatre festival based in Salzburg, Austria, that was founded in 2008 and is produced annually by the NPO Urban Foundation. It has been under the artistic direction of Alexander Wengler and Sergej Pumper since its inception. Since 2012 the two-day festival has been hosted at the "Republic Salzburg" venue, developing new theatre work with local and international hip-hop artists.

Festival origin
In 2007 the members of the dance company Nobulus , founded the festival after performing at "Breakin Convention" in London.

"Hip Hop goes Theatre" is supported by the Arts Councils of Salzburg.

See also
List of hip hop music festivals
Hip hop culture
Breakin' Convention 
Battle of the Year
The Notorious IBE

References

External links
Hip Hop goes Theatre official website

Theatre festivals in Austria
Music festivals established in 2008
Festivals in Salzburg
Dance festivals in Austria
Hip hop theatre festivals
2008 establishments in Austria